Aroa may refer to:

Aroa, genus of moths
Aroa mines, a defunct copper mine in Yaracuy, Venezuela
Aroa, Venezuela, the capital of Bolívar Municipality, Yaracuy, Venezuela
Aroa River (Venezuela), a river of Venezuela
Aroa River (Papua New Guinea), a river of Papua New Guinea

See also 
 Aroa River (disambiguation)